A list of notable buildings and structures in Gabon: